Lepidochrysops yvonnae is a butterfly in the family Lycaenidae. It is found in Zambia. The habitat consists of open marshland in wooded grassland.

Adults feed from the flowers of Ocimum species. They have been recorded on wing in September and early October.

Etymology
The species is named for Wendy Yvonne Gardiner.

References

Butterflies described in 2004
Lepidochrysops
Endemic fauna of Zambia
Butterflies of Africa